RTÉ Radio Cork, also known as RTÉ Cork Local Radio and Cork 89FM, was a local radio station in the Republic of Ireland serving Cork City. The FM signal spilled into Ballincollig and Carrigaline, but the rest of County Cork had to rely on the medium wave signal. It was shut down in 2000.

History
Radio broadcasting in Cork began in 1927 with 6CK, which operated primarily as a local relay for the Dublin-based 2RN, but also produced some of its own content.

RTÉ Cork Local Radio was established on 2 March 1974 as an opt-out service which operated for a limited number of hours per week, relaying the national service (RTÉ Radio 1) at other times. The service was popular but had its hands tied by the limited number of local hours it could output, before reverting the Dublin feed.

In 1989, RTÉ Cork Local Radio was rebranded as "Cork 89FM." It became "RTÉ Radio Cork" in 1994, and was closed in 2000 due to low audience share.

Programmes
One of the most prominent broadcasts was the soap opera Under the Goldie Fish. The title referred to the gilded fish which acts as a weather vane atop the Church of St Anne, Shandon.

Other people
Michael Corcoran
Vincent Hanley
Alf McCarthy
Marty Morrissey
Tony O'Donoghue
Donna O'Sullivan
Gillian Smith

See also
 6CK

References

External links

Radio stations disestablished in 2000
Defunct RTÉ radio stations
Defunct radio stations in the Republic of Ireland
Radio stations established in 1974
Mass media in County Cork